Microbacterium kyungheense is a Gram-positive, aerobic, rod-shaped, non-spore-forming and non-motile bacterium from the genus Microbacterium which has been isolated from salty soil.

References

External links
Type strain of Microbacterium kyungheense at BacDive -  the Bacterial Diversity Metadatabase

Bacteria described in 2014
kyungheense